Eetu Sopanen (born 24 April 1996) is a Finnish former ice hockey defenceman. He last played with KalPa in the Finnish Liiga. He was part of Finland's gold medal winning U20 team at the 2016 World Junior Ice Hockey Championships, however he only got to play 3 games before suffering a knee injury.

Sopanen made his Liiga debut playing with Lahti Pelicans during the 2014–15 Liiga season. He moved to KalPa for the 2016-17 Liiga season. During a Liiga game between KalPa and SaiPa, Sopanen suffered an injury, falling and hitting his head on his teammate's foot, which forced him to end his career at the age of 20.

References

External links

1996 births
Living people
Finnish ice hockey defencemen
Iisalmen Peli-Karhut players
KalPa players
Lahti Pelicans players
Peliitat Heinola players
People from Kouvola
Ice hockey players at the 2012 Winter Youth Olympics
Youth Olympic gold medalists for Finland
Sportspeople from Kymenlaakso